The Jones House, also known as Smith House, is a historical house located on Louisiana Highway 154 about  north of its junction with Louisiana Highway 517. It was built in about 1840 and was listed on the National Register of Historic Places in 1980.

It was built as log dog trot house and was modified in about 1870.  In 1980 the current building was a five-bay central hall plan house.  It was deemed "a typical example of the simplest version of the Greek Revival when it was applied to residences in Louisiana."  It was the home of Louisiana state senator John P. Jones from about 1900 to about 1930.

References

See also
National Register of Historic Places listings in Bienville Parish, Louisiana

Houses on the National Register of Historic Places in Louisiana
Greek Revival architecture in Louisiana
Houses completed in 1840
Bienville Parish, Louisiana